LeClerq is a surname. Notable people with the surname include:

Sophie-Anne Leclerq, a fictional character in the True Blood television drama series
Hugo Pierre Leclercq, French DJ and music producer better known by his stage name, Madeon

See also
Arthur Le Clerq, British songwriter